Kanalnaya is a rural locality (a station) in Svetloyarsky District, Volgograd Oblast, Russia. The population was 377 as of 2010. There are 5 streets.

References 

Rural localities in Svetloyarsky District